Emergency medical services in South Africa are a public/private system aimed at the provision of emergency ambulance service, including emergency care and transportation to hospital.

Organization

Land Ambulance 

Emergency ambulance service is provided by each South African province. The government-operated ambulance system, also known in the Western Cape as METRO (Medical Emergency Transportation and Rescue Operations) provides emergency medical care as well as various rescue options (land, air and sea) to the public. In addition to the paid responders, the government system is supplemented in many areas by volunteers. In cases where volunteers are used, the standards for operation are set by the provincial Health Department, which also provides vehicles, equipment, and operating expenses. Operations are normally administered at the local level through the Emergency Management Service, which oversees police and fire protection as well. The co-location of ambulances with fire apparatus is common in South Africa, although they are two independent services. The national emergency number for ambulances in South Africa is 10 177.

These publicly operated services are supplemented by three private-for-profit ambulance companies, NetCare 911 and ER24, and life response 24/7 of which operate nationally, and by a variety of local private services, such as AmbuStat. The statutory services and private companies are further supplemented by voluntary ambulance services, including the South African Red Cross, and St. John Ambulance. All are required to meet the same standards as the public services with respect to staff qualifications. These services are self-dispatching and do not participate in the national emergency number scheme.

Air Ambulance 
Public air ambulance service is provided by the Red Cross Air Mercy Service from bases in the Western Cape and KwaZulu-Natal. The system operates both helicopters and fixed wing turboprop aircraft.

The Eastern Cape is covered by two bases, one in East London and another in Port Elizabeth. The contract is run by NAC Helicopters on behalf of the Eastern Cape Department of Health. NAC utilise two Bell Longrangers IV.

Private emergency air ambulance service is also provided by Netcare 911, operating nationally with both Fixed Wing (Jet aircraft) and Rotary Wing (Helicopters) Aircraft.

Private air ambulance charters are also available from a number of aircraft charter companies throughout the country.

Rescue 
Technical Rescue services is for the most part provided by the local Fire Service of each municipality. However, due to the reduction in service, much of this has been taken over by volunteer organisations. Nationally, mountain rescue (Berg) is carried out by the Mountain Club of South Africa (MCSA), who work alongside the South African Air Force since the high altitude dictates the use of military specification helicopters. In the Western Cape, technical rescue mostly confined to the Cape Metro is carried out by Wilderness Search and Rescue, who work in conjunction with Cape Metro Ambulance and Red Cross Air Mercy Service. In Kwa Zulu Natal, Life response 24/7 assists with technical rescue and carries out the technical rescue needs in the province in conjunction with the South African Police Service Search and Rescue Division. Rescuetech also has access to its own fleet of aircraft, both fixed and rotary wing, for use in aerial searches and the transport of rescue crews to remote locations.

Standards

Training 

In South Africa there are currently 3 different levels of proficiency in Short course training:

 BAA or Basic Ambulance Assistant – This is a Basic Life Support (BLS) certification, and approximately the equivalent of the US EMT. This is the minimum qualification to be a crew member of an ambulance in South Africa. Training includes a 160-hour course consisting of lectures and practical simulations. The lectures cover basic anatomy and physiology, basic life support (including both CPR and first aid), emergency care, the use of ambulance equipment, including Automated External Defibrillators (AED), and various medico-legal issues.
 AEA or Ambulance Emergency Assistant – This is an Intermediate Life Support (ILS) certification, and generally close to the same scope of the US AEMT in most skills but the South African counterparts have more training, with some added skills. To apply for this training, candidates must have a minimum of 1,000 hours of practical experience as a BAA and they must pass an entrance exam to be eligible for the course. As an alternative route to certification, those completing the more advanced tertiary qualifications may challenge the examination and be certified as an AEA after successfully completing their first or second year of training. Training at this level consists of a 470-hour course, consisting of 240 hours of lectures and practical simulations, and 230 hours of experiential learning. AEA's are qualified to practice various invasive techniques such as IV therapy, needle Cricothyroidotomy and needle Thoracocentesis, as well as Electrocardiogram interpretation, manual external defibrillation, and are allowed to administer various drugs.
 CCA or Critical Care Assistant and the  "National Diploma" – These Advanced Life Support (ALS) candidates must complete a 1,200-hour course to qualify as a CCA in addition to prior BAA and AEA qualifications. This level usually takes more than 4 years to complete. The ND is a three-year, full-time study at college. CCA and ND are both registered as a Paramedic with the Health Professions Council South Africa and they can continue to do an additional 1 yr postgraduate study to obtain the Btech degree.

Below are two new university qualifications;

 ECT or Emergency Care Technician – This mid-level course is of two years duration, and exits on a level just above what many know as Intermediate Life Support (ILS), but similar to Advanced Life Support (ALS), yet without advanced airway management manoeuvres.  Students who pass this course are eligible to apply to the HPCSA to be registered in the category of Emergency Care Technician (ECT).
 BTech/BEMC or The bachelor's degree Technology or bachelor's degree in Emergency Medical Care – This is a four-year professional degree, and students who complete this degree are eligible to be registered with the HPCSA as Emergency Care Practitioner (ECP), which has an additional scope of practice over the Critical Care Assistant and the National Diploma qualifications. The two additions in stand-alone capabilities are Thrombolysis and Rapid sequence induction. ECPs are also trained in the rescue disciplines offered by their institutions, normally up to the level of Advanced Rescue Practitioner. Example: High Angle II, Motor Vehicle, Fire Search and Rescue, Aviation, Confined Space, Structural Collapse, Industrial and Agricultural, Trench, Aquatic Rescue, etc. The advantage of the Btech qualification is that it is a university qualification that is consistent with the international industry trend.
Further opportunities for educational advancement exist for the ECP, as they are able to articulate into various Masters (M.EMC)(Mphil.EM)(MSc.EM) and Doctorate (DEMC)(PhD) programmes.

All EMS personnel in South Africa are required to meet the standards of the governing body, the Health Professions Council of South Africa. A formal register is maintained for each type of EMS certification. All health practitioners in The Republic of South Africa are regulated by the Health Professions Council of South Africa (HPCSA) as set out in the Health Professions ACT. To confirm a practitioner's qualification and license, one can check the i-Register

Future training 
Recently, the Health Professions Council of South Africa (HPCSA), has begun steps to change the system of education in the Emergency Services and they hope to change the EMS training system by 2010. These steps would involve limiting short course ( BAA ) and only having a 2-year nCert (Intermediate level qualification) and B-Tech (ALS level qualification). Given the economics of the system and its current reliance on volunteers in some communities and locales, it remains unclear whether it will be either possible or practical to eliminate the BAA certification for anyone other than paid staff in the near future.

The mid-level course is 2 years in duration, and exits on a level slightly above Ambulance Emergency Assistant (AEA), but below Advanced Life Support (ALS). They are placed on the Emergency Care Technician (ECT) register. The clinician qualification is a four-year professional degree in Emergency Medical Care (Bachelor Emergency Medical Care), and is placed on the Emergency Care Practitioner (ECP) register. The five institutions in the country currently presenting the ECP qualification are the:

 University of Johannesburg
 Central University of Technology
 Durban University of Technology
 Cape Peninsula University of Technology
 Nelson Mandela Metropolitan University

Medical oversight 
Under the old system, all levels of EMS personnel essentially functioned as an extension of their Medical Director's license to practice medicine. Under the new system, both Emergency Care Technicians and Emergency Care Practitioners are permitted considerable latitude with respect to independent practice. Standing orders or protocols do exist, and consultation with a physician (particularly for all levels of qualifications) is an option, but for the most part the ECP, CCA, PARAMEDIC (N. DIP) and ECT (6) functions as a fully independent practitioner, similar to the Paramedic Practitioners in the UK. Protocols are currently as of 2016, being referred to and replaced by: Clinical Practice Guidelines; and will thus phase out the terminology of "protocols"

Staffing 
Currently, ambulances are staffed by the BLS and ILS practitioners, usually working paired together (BAA & AEA). In many volunteer services however, a crew of two BAAs is not uncommon. The ALS providers normally work on rapid response vehicles to improve response times. ALS is required to be dispatched in support of the ambulance crew to all Priority 1 (Code Red) patients (those with high-acuity conditions or injuries). The national objective is to have one staffed emergency ambulance for every 10,000 population by 2010; however, in some parts of the country this ratio is currently approximately 1 ambulance for every 30,000.

Vehicles 
The vehicles used by EMS in South Africa can vary greatly across a broad range. They may be large or small, new or quite old, often driven by local economics. There is no specific current standard for ambulance design in South Africa. Some vehicles comply with either the European standard CEN 1789 or the US standard, KKK-1822, but many meet neither standard. There are even examples of motorcycles with stretcher-carrying sidecars. There is currently a major initiative underway by the government of South Africa to replace much of the aging fleet with new high standard emergency ambulances. Plans call for the replacement of approximately 450 ambulances by 2010.

Dispatch 

In the past, EMS dispatch has occurred from a variety of sources, and in many cases, has involved self-dispatch, which the currently operating private companies still do. The evolution of EMS is a national priority, and the government has created a National Emergency Medical Service Strategic Framework, complete with goals and timelines. The current objective calls for centralised dispatch to be available from at least two call centres, located in major centres, in each South African province by 2010. A national emergency telephone number for EMS has been established. This number is 10–177.

Response times 
There are currently no official "response time" standards in the South African system. However, response times of fifteen minutes for high-acuity calls in urban areas are considered acceptable, and in rural areas, response times of up to forty minutes for similar calls are not uncommon.

See also 
 Healthcare in South Africa

References

Further reading 
 "International EMS systems in South Africa: past, present, and future", C . MacFarlane et al., Resuscitation, Volume 64, Issue 2, Pages 145–148.